The white-bellied warbler (Basileuterus culicivorus hypoleucus) is a bird in the family Parulidae. It is found in Bolivia, Brazil, and Paraguay. It resembles the closely related golden-crowned warbler (the two sometimes hybridize), but its underparts are entirely whitish instead of yellow. Recently, the South American Classification committee of the AOU reclassified the white-bellied warbler as a subspecies of the golden-crowned warbler based on studies by Lovette et al. and Vilaca and Santos.

Its natural habitats are subtropical or tropical dry forests and subtropical or tropical moist lowland forests.

References
Lovette, I. J. et al.  2010.  A comprehensive multilocus phylogeny for the wood-warblers and a revised classification of the Parulidae (Aves).  Molecular Phylogenetics and Evolution 57: 753–770.
Vilaca, S. T., and F. R. Santos.  2010.  Biogeographic history of the species complex Basileuterus culicivorus (Aves, Parulidae).  Molecular Phylogenetics Evolution 57: 585–597.
 BirdLife International 2004.  Basileuterus hypoleucus.   2006 IUCN Red List of Threatened Species.   Downloaded on 25 July 2007.

Basileuterus
Taxa named by Charles Lucien Bonaparte
Taxonomy articles created by Polbot